This list orders the highest skyscrapers of the Canary Islands (Spain). At present, the tallest building in the Canary Islands is the complex of the Torres de Santa Cruz, located in the city of Santa Cruz de Tenerife, with 120 meters high are the tallest twin towers in Spain. The second tallest building in the archipelago after these two towers, is the Yaiza I Tower, 105 meters high and located in Las Palmas de Gran Canaria.

Tallest buildings 
List of skyscrapers with more than 50m. of the Canary Islands, although the total of tall buildings in the two Canarian capitals according to Emporis.com data is: 17 in Santa Cruz de Tenerife and 15 in Las Palmas de Gran Canaria.

References

External links 
 Emporis.com

Skyscrapers in Spain
Buildings and structures in the Canary Islands